Jan op den Velde (11 July 1931 – 3 February 2022) was a Dutch rower. Op den Velde was born in 1931 in Zaandam, the Netherlands. He was a member of the student rowing club D.S.R.V. Laga. He competed at the 1952 Summer Olympics in Helsinki with the men's coxless four where they were eliminated in the round one repêchage. He died on 3 February 2022 at the age of 90.

References

1931 births
2022 deaths 
Dutch male rowers
Olympic rowers of the Netherlands
Rowers at the 1952 Summer Olympics
Delft University of Technology alumni
Sportspeople from Zaanstad
European Rowing Championships medalists
20th-century Dutch people
21st-century Dutch people